A Lithuanian Uruguayan is a Uruguayan citizen who is fully or partially of Lithuanian descent.

Lithuanians migrated to Uruguay mostly during the 1920s and 1930s; they eventually reached the 10,000-people-mark. They established their own institutions, such as the Uruguay-Lithuania Cultural Association and several Lithuanian-language newspapers, notably Naujoji Banga.

There is also a small Lithuanian Jewish community in Montevideo.

The 2011 Uruguayan census revealed 104 people who declared Lithuania as their country of birth.

Notable people
Zoma Baitler, artist
Ladislao Brazionis, footballer
Victorio Cieslinskas, Olympic basketball player (bronze in 1952)
Vladas Doukšas, footballer
José Gurvich, painter
Leonel Pilipauskas, footballer
Lilián Abracinskas, female activist
Nicolás Vikonis, footballer

References

External links
  

Uruguay
Ethnic groups in Uruguay
Immigration to Uruguay
Lithuania–Uruguay relations
European Uruguayan